Yuri S. Kivshar (born in Kharkiv, Ukrainian SSR, USSR), Australian Scientist of Ukrainian origin, distinguished professor, head of Nonlinear Physics Centre of The Australian National University (ANU) (Canberra, Australia) and research director of The International Research Centre for Nanophotonics and Metamaterials (St. Petersburg, Russia), Australian Federation Fellow.

Education
Yuri Kivshar was born in Kharkov, USSR (now Kharkiv, Ukraine). He studied at Kharkiv school of physics founded by nobel prize laureate Lev Landau. In 1984 he received Doctor of Philosophy degree and in 1989 aged 30 he became the youngest research fellow of Verkin Institute for Low Temperature Physics and Engineering.

Career
Starting from 1991 he worked as a scientist in USA, Finland, Spain, Germany and in 1993 he was invited to the Optical Sciences Centre of Australia and later founded his own laboratory Nonlinear Physics Centre of ANU.

Starting from 2000 Yuri Kivshar worked in different fields of nonlinear optics and carried out research of solitons and metamaterials, nonlinear photonic crystal and composite materials theories.

He made fundamental impact into self-focusing effect, 
metamaterials,
dielectric nanoantennas,
topological insulators, optic signal processing and optic communications. He also discovered series of solitons and described their properties.

In 2010 Yuri Kivshar was invited to St. Petersburg, Russia in terms of government Megagrant program. He became a scientific leader of the International Research Centre for Nanophotonics and Metamaterials of the ITMO University (Saint-Petersburg, Russia).

Publications
Professor Kivshar authored and co-authored of more than 900 scientific papers. His h-index is 140. His work has generated over 38,000 citations.

Awards
Throughout his career he has received awards, including the Stefanos Pnevmatikos International Award, in his continued contributions to nonlinear optics and electrodynamics.

Medals

Books

See also
Metamaterials
Photonic crystal
Solitons

References

1959 births
Metamaterials scientists
20th-century Ukrainian physicists
National University of Kharkiv alumni
Living people
21st-century Australian physicists
Fellows of the Australian Academy of Science
21st-century Ukrainian physicists
Ukrainian emigrants to Australia
Optical physicists
Academic staff of the Australian National University